Dawn Joanne Langstroth (born April 16, 1979) is a Canadian singer, songwriter and painter. Raised in Toronto, she has released two EPs, self-titled Dawn Langstroth and No Mercy, and released her debut album Highwire in 2009. Langstroth is the daughter of singer Anne Murray and former CBC television producer Bill Langstroth (Singalong Jubilee).

Music 

Langstroth has worked with Grammy Award winning producers Phil Ramone, George Massenburg, and Ed Cherney, and notable acts such as Jann Arden, The Rankin Family, Shelby Lynne and John McDermott.

Painting 

Langstroth is known for a playful, semi-cubist illustration style and the inclusion of family pets in her paintings.

Discography

Albums

EPs  
(Extended Play record)

Singles

Music videos

Soundtracks

Awards and nominations

Video 
 "Dark and Twisted" 2009
 "Mother's Child"  –  Live at Blackbird, Studio C, July 2007

References

External links
 DawnLangstroth.com – Official website.
 Emotional Rescue – People Magazine article.

1979 births
Living people
Artists from Toronto
Canadian women pop singers
Canadian women painters
Musicians from Toronto
People from York, Toronto
21st-century Canadian painters
21st-century Canadian women singers
Anne Murray